Chanterelle is the common name of several species of edible mushroom.

Chanterelle may also refer to:

Chanterelle, Cantal, a commune of Cantal département, southwest France  
Chanterelle, Les Anglais, Haiti, a rural settlement in the Chardonnières Arrondissement
Chanterelle (Hollyoaks), a fictional character of the British television series
Chanterelle (New York City restaurant), US
 Chanterelle, the melody string on a hurdy gurdy